Relations between the Republic of Singapore and the Republic of Korea (South Korea) started when a trade mission from South Korea visited the Colony of Singapore in 1950. The two countries established formal diplomatic relations in 1975, but South Korea established a trade office and a consulate-general, and sent a special envoy to visit Singapore before that. Both countries are the only two United Nations members in the Four Asian Tigers. In 2014, South Korea was the fourth-largest import source of Singapore.

History 
The earliest contact between Singapore and South Korea was dated to April 1950, when South Korean trade delegation paid a 5-day visit to Singapore. South Korea then established a Korea Trade Centre in Singapore in 1964. After Singapore's independence in 1965, the two countries established a fishing venture in 1967. In August 1969, Han Pyo-wook, the Ambassador of South Korea to Thailand, visited Singapore as the special envoy of Park Chung-hee, the President of South Korea, becoming the first official contact between the two countries. During his visit, Han met S. Rajaratnam, the Minister for Foreign Affairs of Singapore and handed a "special message" to Yusof Ishak, the President of Singapore. Some political observers believed that the visit of Han was a "counterbalance" to the visit of a North Korean special envoy team in the previous month.

In 1971, South Korea and Singapore established consular relations by renaming the Korea Trade Centre to a consulate-general. The two countries established formal diplomatic relations in 1975. In 1979, Lee Kuan Yew became the first Prime Minister of Singapore visiting South Korea. The two countries started regular ministerial meetings in the same year. In 1981, Chun Doo-hwan, the President of South Korea paid a state visit to Singapore, making him the first President of South Korea to do so. In 2002, S. R. Nathan became the first President of Singapore visiting South Korea.

In 2005, Lim Hng Kiang, the Minister for Trade and Industry of Singapore and Ban Ki-moon, the Minister of Foreign Affairs and Trade of South Korea signed Korea-Singapore Free Trade Agreement. It was valid in 2006.

When Lee Kuan Yew died in 2015, Park Geun-hye, then President of South Korea, visited Singapore to attend his funeral.

Trade relations
According to the data from The Observatory of Economic Complexity, the exported value from Singapore to South Korea increased between 1995 and 2014. It reached a peak of 12 billion US dollars in 2014. Singapore mainly exported machines and chemical products to South Korea. The proportion of refined oil in the exported value had increased since 2007.

The exported value from South Korea to Singapore was between 4 billion and 6 billion US dollars from 1995 to 2003, and it started increasing since 2004. It reached a peak of 26 billion US dollars in 2012. South Korea mainly exported machines and chemical products to Singapore. The proportion of refined oil in the exported value had increased since 2003, while the proportion of commercial vessels in the exported value had increased after that.

Cultural relations 
Lawrence Wong, the Acting Minister for Culture, Community and Youth of Singapore, visited South Korea twice in 2013 for the launch of the exhibition entitled “The Peranakan World: Cross-cultural Art from Singapore and the Straits” at the National Museum of Korea and attending the inaugural ROK-Southeast Asia Culture Ministers’ Meeting held in Gwangju, separately.

On November 12, 2014, Singapore organized the first ASEAN K-pop Dance Cover Festival.

See also 

 Foreign relations of Singapore
 Foreign relations of South Korea

References

External links 
 Embassy of Singapore, Seoul
 Embassy of South Korea, Singapore

 
Korea, South
Singapore